Cosmosoma scita is a moth of the subfamily Arctiinae. It was described by Francis Walker in 1856. It is found in the Amazon region.

References

scita
Moths described in 1856